The Halliburton House is a historic house at 300 West Halliburton Street in De Witt, Arkansas.  It is a two-story wood-frame structure, with a gable roof and end chimneys.  The main facade is five bays wide, with a central entry sheltered by a portico supported by paired Doric columns.  The house's significance lies in its construction and occupation in 1860 by William Henry Halliburton (1816-1912), who, as the deputy sheriff of Arkansas, oversaw the 1853 purchase of the land that became De Witt, when the county seat was relocated following the separation of Desha County.  Halliburton served as a county official in a variety of capacities until the American Civil War.  After twenty years in private legal practice he served three terms in the state legislature.

The house was listed on the National Register of Historic Places in 1974.

See also
National Register of Historic Places listings in Arkansas County, Arkansas

References

Houses on the National Register of Historic Places in Arkansas
Houses completed in 1855
Houses in Arkansas County, Arkansas
National Register of Historic Places in Arkansas County, Arkansas
1855 establishments in Arkansas
DeWitt, Arkansas